Jean Henri Hassenfratz (20 December 1755 – 26 February 1827) was a French chemist, physics professor, mine inspector, and participant in the French Revolution.

In 1794, Hassenfratz took part (with Monge) in the creation of the École Polytechnique (first known as École centrale des travaux publics). Hassenfratz became its first professor of physics, a position he held until 1815, when he was succeeded by Alexis Petit (a former child prodigy and Polytechnique alumni who would soon discover the Dulong–Petit law, in 1819).

External links
 Hassenfratz's (1802) "Sur les Ombres colorées," Journal de l'Ecole polytechnique, ou Bulletin du travail fait à cette école, ser. 1, vol. 4, p. 272 - 283 - digital facsimile from the Linda Hall Library

1755 births
1827 deaths
19th-century French chemists
Scientists from Paris
18th-century French chemists
Academic staff of École Polytechnique